The Frontiersmen Camping Fellowship is a program of the Royal Rangers, and serves as their service/honor organization, similar to the Boy Scouts of America's Order of the Arrow.  It endeavors to develop in each member the same courageous and undaunted spirit of the early frontiersman. High moral and contagious enthusiasm are developed by urging each member to strive to achieve important accomplishments.

Courage
Achievement
Friendship
Leadership
Woodsmanship (Bushcraft, Australia)

Young adults in the Royal Rangers program who meet the requirements are strongly encouraged by its leaders to pursue an interest in becoming a part of the FCF. Skills that can be learned from the FCF are campfire cooking, Christian service in the community, fellowship, frontier outfit making, black powder rifle shooting, trading, tomahawk and knife throwing, teepee camping, hide tanning, bead craft, scrimshaw, leather craft, wood working, and  more.

The FCF can provide a young Royal Ranger many different opportunities for growth and development. This provision however, can only be enabled through the participation and involvement of FCF members within the outpost. Keeping alive the spirit of the FCF means getting young bucks involved and keeping them involved. There are many skills that he must learn and develop before he becomes an "old timer", along with learning what it means to be a part of the Frontiersmen Camping Fellowship.

Entrance To FCF

In Australia a new recruit wishing to enter FCF must fulfill the following criteria
Adventure Ranger Age
Meet the other requirements

Upon this they then undertake an entrance exam, Phase 1 and 2 testing.
Phase 1 testing comprises practical knowledge, e.g., compass work and lashings. To pass recruits must
Pass the Bible section of Phase 1 with 90% or more.
They are allowed to fail only 2 sections.

In the United States these are the requirements for joining FCF:

Boys
 Earn all 8 red "Trail of the Grizzly" merits (Camping, First Aid Skills, Toolcraft, Ropecraft, Lashing, Compass, Firecraft, Cooking)
 Be an Adventure Ranger in at least the sixth grade and be at least 11 years old
 Be recommended by an Outpost Commander
 Explain the Plan of Salvation
 Recite the Meaning of the four Red Points, four Gold Points and eight Blue Points of the Royal Ranger Emblem

Leaders
 Earn or teach the eight red "Trail of the Grizzly Merits" (Camping, First Aid Skills, Toolcraft, Ropecraft, Lashing, Compass, Firecraft, Cooking)
 Complete the Royal Rangers Basics & Essentials Modules(FCF Handbook page 34) of the Leaders Training Academy
 Be a leader in good standing in the local church

Upon earning all eight merits, both men and boys are eligible to wear the Trail of the Grizzly patch. They must then complete a Frontier Adventure before being awarded their Frontiersman Pin.

Trades

Australian FCF members, particularly those in New South Wales, are encouraged to pick up "trades". A "trade" is a line of work typically undertaken in the 1800s. New FCF members can create a costume, reflecting on what a typical person in that trade would wear. They can also man a stall in the "FCF Village" during major Rangers gatherings.

External links
http://www.nationalfcf.com/ National FCF website
http://www.fcfworld.com/ A site dedicated to Frontiersmen Camping Fellowship (FCF)
http://www.indiannationfcf.com/ Indian Nation FCF
http://royalrangers.ag.org - The Official website of Royal Rangers
http://www.royalrangersinternational.com/ - The Official website of Royal Rangers International, the liaison between the United States Royal Rangers and other national programs
https://web.archive.org/web/20070811203912/http://www.rangersaustralia.org.au/ - The official site for Rangers in Australia

Assemblies of God
Youth organisations based in Australia
Christian non-aligned Scouting organizations
Pentecostalism in Australia